Baiyun Temple may refer to:

China
 White Cloud Temple, Taoist temple in Beijing
 Baiyun Temple (Mount Wutai), Buddhist temple on Mount Wutai, in Shanxi
 Baiyun Temple (Ningxiang), Buddhist temple in Ningxiang, Hunan
 Baiyun Temple (Huixian), in Huixian, Xinxiang, Henan
 Baiyun Temple, an early name for Bishan Temple in Taihuai, Wutai, Xinzhou, Shanxi

See also
 Baiyun (disambiguation)

Buddhist temple disambiguation pages